Max Darj (born 27 September 1991) is a Swedish handball player for Füchse Berlin and the Swedish national team.

References

External links

1991 births
Living people
Handball players from Gothenburg
Swedish male handball players
Expatriate handball players
Swedish expatriate sportspeople in Germany
Handball-Bundesliga players
Handball players at the 2020 Summer Olympics
Olympic handball players of Sweden
Bergischer HC players
Füchse Berlin Reinickendorf HBC players